The Townley Venus is a 2.14 m (7 ft) high 1st or 2nd century AD Roman sculpture in Proconnesian marble of the goddess Venus, from the collection of Charles Towneley.  It was bought by him from the dealer Gavin Hamilton, who excavated it at Ostia in 1775.  He shipped it to England in two pieces (it was already in these pieces when found) to get it past the Papal antiquaries' customs checks.

Adapted from a lost Greek original of the 4th century BC, the goddess is half-draped, with her torso nude.  The arms were restored in the 18th century and the statue was set in another plinth, thereby changing the original pose and viewpoint. If the restoration is correct, her arms are in a pose reminiscent of the Venus of Capua or Venus de Milo, and like them she may have held a mirror.

It was sold to the British Museum in 1805 as Registration Number 1805,0703.15 and Sculpture 1574, and is usually on display in Room 84, although it went on tour to the 2007 Praxiteles exhibition at the Louvre. The statue was damaged in December 2015 when a waiter working in the museum accidentally hit the right hand which knocked off the thumb but it has since been restored.

See also 

 Townley Vase

References

Sculptures of Venus
Venus
Ancient Greek and Roman sculptures in the British Museum
Archaeological discoveries in Italy
Ostia (ancient city)